RER may refer to:

Transport

In France 
Réseau Express Régional, or RER d'Île-de-France, the commuter rail service serving Paris and its suburbs
Réseau Express Régional Franco-Valdo-Genevois, now called Léman Express, commuter rail service serving Geneva (Switzerland), Annemasse (France) and its suburbs

In Belgium 
Réseau Express Régional Bruxellois (Brussels Regional Express Network), the commuter rail service serving Brussels and its suburbs and commuters
Réseau Express Régional Gantois (Ghent Regional Express Network), the commuter rail service serving Ghent and its suburbs and commuters

In Switzerland 
Réseau Express Régional Bernois, the name used for the Bern S-Bahn in French speaking areas.
Réseau Express Régional Vaudois, commuter rail service serving Vaud and its suburbs
Réseau Express Régional Fribourgeois, commuter rail service serving Fribourg and its suburbs
Réseau Express Régional trinational de Bâle, the name used for the Basel S-Bahn in French speaking areas.
Réseau Express Régional franco-valdo-genevois, now called Léman Express, commuter rail service serving Geneva, Annemasse and its suburbs

In Argentina 
Red de Expresos Regionales, a planned commuter rail service in Buenos Aires

In Canada 
GO Regional Express Rail, a planned commuter rail service in Toronto and its suburbs

Other uses
Rebuilt Reading electric multiple units
The Real Estate Roundtable, a non-profit public policy organization that represents the interests of real estate
Real exchange rate, the purchasing power of a currency relative to another at current exchange rates and prices
RēR, the standard abbreviation for the label Recommended Records
Resident Evil: Revelations, a Capcom game
Respiratory exchange ratio, the ratio between the amount of carbon dioxide produced in metabolism and oxygen used
Rough endoplasmic reticulum, a type of endoplasmic reticulum protein-manufacturing ribosomes